Gajevi is a village in the municipalities of Šamac (Republika Srpska) and Gradačac, Bosnia and Herzegovina.

Demographics 
According to the 2013 census, its population was 488, with 463 of them living in the Šamac part and 25 (all Bosniaks) in the Gradačac part.

References

Populated places in Šamac, Bosnia and Herzegovina
Populated places in Gradačac
Villages in Republika Srpska